Mike Bertsch is a former ice hockey player and coach for Colorado College. Bertsch is currently working for USA Hockey after spending several years in the private sector.

Career
Over Bertsch's 4-year stint as a player for the Tigers, he posted several good seasons as a scorer, finishing 6th all time in school history in 1972–73 with 145 points in 124 games. The scoring prowess did not, however, translate into much on-ice success as CC finished each season with a losing record and made the playoffs only once during his tenure (albeit as the final qualifier). Once Bertsch graduated from Colorado College his playing days were over, but his affiliation with his alma mater had only just begun. Bertsch returned to Colorado Springs in the fall of 1978 to join the staff of his former head coach Jeff Sauer as an assistant.

Bertsch stayed in that role for four seasons before Sauer left to take over at Wisconsin and Mike was chosen as his successor. After a stumble out of the gate, Bertsch pushed the Tigers to at least respectable records in the mid-1980s, but CC bottomed out in 1987–88 with a school record 33-loss season (though not the worst season in program history) and Bertsch was done as coach after the season.

After leaving CC Bertsch moved on to the private sector, working for both Current Inc. and Deluxe Corporation over a 14-year span. However, he couldn't stay away from the game and in 2003 began working for USA Hockey, spending most of his time working in the business and marketing departments. As of 2014 Bertsch is still working for USA Hockey as Senior Director of Corporate Affairs.

Career statistics

Head coaching record

References

External links

Living people
Colorado College Tigers men's ice hockey coaches
Colorado College Tigers men's ice hockey players
Year of birth missing (living people)